Ninein-like protein is a protein that in humans is encoded by the NINL gene. It is part of the centrosome.

Model organisms
 
Model organisms have been used in the study of NINL function. A conditional knockout mouse line, called Ninltm1a(EUCOMM)Wtsi was generated as part of the International Knockout Mouse Consortium program — a high-throughput mutagenesis project to generate and distribute animal models of disease to interested scientists — at the Wellcome Trust Sanger Institute. Male and female animals underwent a standardized phenotypic screen to determine the effects of deletion.
Twenty five tests were carried out on mutant mice, however no significant abnormalities were observed.

References

Further reading

Genes mutated in mice
EF-hand-containing proteins